Madison County is a county in the U.S. state of Indiana. The 2020 census states the population is standing at 130,129. The county seat since 1836 has been Anderson, one of three incorporated cities within the county.

Madison County is included in the Indianapolis-Carmel-Anderson, IN Metropolitan Statistical Area.

History

In 1787, the fledgling United States defined the Northwest Territory, which included the area of present-day Indiana. In 1800, Congress separated Ohio from the Northwest Territory, designating the rest of the land as the Indiana Territory. President Thomas Jefferson chose William Henry Harrison as the territory's first governor, and Vincennes was established as the territorial capital. After the Michigan Territory was separated and the Illinois Territory was formed, Indiana was reduced to its current size and geography. By December 1816 the Indiana Territory was admitted to the Union as a state.

Starting in 1794, Native American titles to Indiana lands were extinguished by usurpation, purchase, or war and treaty. The United States acquired land from the Native Americans in the 1809 treaty of Fort Wayne, and by the treaty of St. Mary's in 1818 considerably more territory became property of the government. This included the future Madison County, which was authorized by the state legislature on 4 January 1823, designating areas covered by the Delaware New Purchase. No settler was allowed in the area until the government survey was completed in 1820, and in 1820 the first settlers entered the future county.

The new county was named for James Madison, co-author of The Federalist Papers and the fourth President of the United States (1809 to 1817). The then-small settlement of Pendleton was named as the county, but its non-central location soon fostered a desire for a more central location as the county seat. After considerable local competition, the town of Anderson was platted in 1827 on donated land with the stipulation that the seat be moved to that location. This move began in 1828 and was completed by 1836.

The new county was completely wooded in 1820, with stands of white oak, poplar, walnut, sycamore, oak, and fir trees. The settlers logged much of the area and cleared the remainder through burning; at present its terrain is completely devoted to agriculture or urban development, except for stands of brush in drainages.

The county's first courthouse was authorized in the county's 1828 session, but this authorization was revoked in 1829. In 1831 a second authorization was passed, and the completed building was placed in service the following year.

During the Indiana gas boom, natural gas deposits were discovered in the county in 1887, at Alexandria, and Anderson. The offer of free natural gas brought several factories to the county.

Geography
The county's terrain is nearly flat, with the exception of hilly areas along the White River and Fall Creek. The highest terrain (around  ASL) is a ridgeline at the county's SE corner. The county is drained by the west branch of the White River, flowing west-southwestward through the county's lower central portion. Other drainages include Fall Creek, flowing west- and southwestward through the southern part of the county; Pipe Creek, which rises in Delaware County and flows southwestward through the county's NW corner; and Lick Creek, which rises in Henry County and flows westward through the county's SW portion.

Adjacent counties

 Grant County - north
 Delaware County - east
 Henry County - southeast
 Hancock County - south
 Hamilton County - west
 Tipton County - northwest

Protected areas
 Mounds State Park

Cities

 Alexandria
 Anderson (county seat)
 Elwood (part)

Towns

 Chesterfield
 Country Club Heights
 Edgewood
 Frankton
 Ingalls
 Lapel
 Markleville
 Orestes
 Pendleton
 River Forest
 Summitville

Unincorporated towns

 Alfont
 Alliance
 Bloomer
 College Corner
 Dundee
 Edgewood Village
 Emporia
 Fishersburg
 Florida
 Gimco City
 Hamilton
 Hardscrabble
 Huntsville
 Idlewold
 Leisure
 Linwood
 Moonville
 New Columbus (also known as Ovid)
 North Anderson
 Ovid (also known as New Columbus)
 Perkinsville
 Prosperity
 Rigdon
 South Elwood
 Sunview
 Woodlawn Heights

Townships

 Adams
 Anderson
 Boone
 Duck Creek
 Fall Creek
 Green
 Jackson
 Lafayette
 Monroe
 Pipe Creek
 Richland
 Stony Creek
 Union
 Van Buren

Major highways

  Interstate 69
  U.S. Route 36
  State Road 9
  State Road 13
  State Road 28
  State Road 32
  State Road 37
  State Road 38
  State Road 67
  State Road 109
  State Road 128
  State Road 232
  State Road 236

Railroads

 Central Indiana and Western Railroad
 CSX Transportation
 Indian Creek Railroad
 Norfolk Southern Railway

Climate and weather

Government

The county government is a constitutional body, and is granted specific powers by the Constitution of Indiana, and by the Indiana Code.

County Council: The legislative branch of the county government; controls spending and revenue collection in the county. Representatives are elected to four-year terms from county districts. They set salaries, the annual budget, and special spending. The council has limited authority to impose local taxes, in the form of an income and property tax that is subject to state level approval, excise taxes, and service taxes.

Board of Commissioners: The executive body of the county; commissioners are elected county-wide to staggered four-year terms. One commissioner serves as president. The commissioners execute acts legislated by the council, collect revenue, and manage the county government.

Court: The county maintains a small claims court that handles civil cases. The judge on the court is elected to a term of four years and must be a member of the Indiana Bar Association. The judge is assisted by a constable who is also elected to a four-year term. In some cases, court decisions can be appealed to the state level circuit court.

County Officials: The county has other elected offices, including sheriff, coroner, auditor, treasurer, recorder, surveyor, and circuit court clerk. These officers are elected to four-year terms. Members elected to county government positions are required to declare party affiliations and to be residents of the county.

Madison County is part of Indiana's 5th congressional district; Indiana Senate districts 20, 25 and 26; and Indiana House of Representatives districts 35, 36 and 37.

Demographics

2010 census
As of the 2010 United States Census, there were 131,636 people, 51,927 households, and 34,319 families in the county. The racial makeup of the county was 87.7% white, 8.3% black or African American, 0.4% Asian, 0.2% American Indian, 1.5% from other races, and 1.8% from two or more races. Those of Hispanic or Latino origin made up 3.2% of the population. In terms of ancestry, 21.5% were German, 12.5% were American, 11.5% were Irish, and 10.4% were English.

Of the 51,927 households, 31.3% had children under the age of 18 living with them, 47.4% were married couples living together, 13.6% had a female householder with no husband present, 33.9% were non-families, and 28.3% of all households were made up of individuals. The average household size was 2.41 and the average family size was 2.93. The median age was 39.2 years.

The median income for a household in the county was $47,697 and the median income for a family was $53,906. Males had a median income of $41,834 versus $31,743 for females. The per capita income for the county was $21,722. About 11.2% of families and 14.7% of the population were below the poverty line, including 22.6% of those under age 18 and 7.7% of those age 65 or over.

Education
School districts include:
 Alexandria Community School Corporation
 Anderson Community School Corporation
 Elwood Community School Corporation
 Frankton-Lapel Community Schools
 Madison-Grant United School Corporation
 South Madison Community School Corporation

See also

 National Register of Historic Places listings in Madison County, Indiana

References

Further reading
 Harden, Samuel. History of Madison County, Indiana, from 1820 to 1874: Giving a general review of principal events, statistical and historical items, derived from official sources.. Lewis Publishing Company (1874).

External links
 We Are Madison County
 The Madison County Council of Governments
 Madison County Sheriffs Department
 Madison County News
 Madison County ALERT News
 Madison County Government Center
 List of Madison County Cemeteries

 
Indiana counties
1823 establishments in Indiana
Populated places established in 1823
Indianapolis metropolitan area